is the 7th single of Japanese girl group Kalafina. The title track is the opening theme to the anime series Sound of the Sky (So Ra No Wo To).

Track list

CD

DVD

Charts

2009 songs
2010 singles
Kalafina songs
Anime songs
SME Records singles
Songs written by Yuki Kajiura